The 1900 Montana football team represented the University of Montana as an independent during the 1900 college football season. Led by first-year head coach Frank Bean, Montana compiled a record of 0–1.

Schedule

References

Montana
Montana Grizzlies football seasons
College football winless seasons
Montana football